Biber (German for beaver) is a German surname. Notable people with the surname include:

Carl Heinrich Biber (1681–1749), Austrian violinist and composer, son of Heinrich Ignaz Biber
George Edward Biber (1801–1874), German writer
Heinrich Ignaz Franz Biber (1644–1704), Bohemian-Austrian composer and violinist
James Biber, American architect
Kathryn Biber (born 1978), American lawyer
Michael Biber (born 1974), American businessman
Stanley Biber (1923–2006), American surgeon who pioneered sex reassignment surgery

See also

Bieber (surname)
Beber (surname)
Bibek

German-language surnames
Germanic-language surnames
Surnames of German origin
Surnames from nicknames